The Prairie is a 1947 American Western film  based on the novel The Prairie by James Fenimore Cooper.

Cast
Lenore Aubert as Ellen Wade
Alan Baxter as Paul Hover
Russ Vincent as Abiram White
Jack Mitchum as Asa Bush
Charles Evans as Ishmael Bush
Edna Holland as Esther Bush
Chief Thundercloud as Eagle Feather
Fred Coby as Abner Bush
Bill Murphy as Jess Bush
David Gerber as Gabe Bush
Don Lynch as Enoch Bush
George Morrell as Luke

Production
The film was made by a new company, a co-operative venture between director Frank Wisbar, production manager Edward Finney and writer Arthur St Claire. The financed, cast and made the picture themselves. Reportedly Wisbar raised some finance from his family back in Germany.

It was shot at a new studios, the Motion Picture Center, over 12 days at an estimated $10,000 a day.

"This is an interesting, a desperate, attempt to break the deadlock on independent production", said Wisbar. "The other boys and I made up our minds to finance, cast and film a picture as well as it could be done, without interference from the "front office", distributors, or anyone else. We did this knowing a low budget can be – and usually is – the ruin of a good picture. I know. I've made them; bad ones."

Wisbar said they picked Cooper's novel because it was in the public domain and also "because it keeps the rootin', tootin', and shootin' to a minimum and stresses the human element, the story of a man who was a law unto himself. We wrote our script straight, cutting out every scene that was not absolutely necessary."

Wisbar said the film was made in a style that was "realistic but stylised. Camera treatment is modern in what I would call highly poetic."

The film marked the acting debut for Robert Mitchum's brother John.

Reception
The Los Angeles Times said "I wish I could say the film makes some claim on artistry."

Associated Producers Inc announced a new version of the book would be filmed on 2 March 1959 but it appears to have not been made.

References

External links

The Prairie at Letterbox DVD

1947 films
Films based on American novels
American action adventure films
1947 Western (genre) films
Lippert Pictures films
American Western (genre) films
American black-and-white films
1940s English-language films
1940s American films
1940s action adventure films